Karima Souid, born April 4, 1971, in Lyon, is a Tunisian politician, member of the Social Democratic Path.

Biography 
Born April 4, 1971, in the 3rd arrondissement of Lyon, she holds a BA in Philosophy and Letters, and follows graduate studies in tourism. She then becomes a Senior Project Manager in a business and event tourism company.

After the 2011 Tunisian revolution, she joins the Democratic Forum for Labour and Liberties (Ettakatol) in February and is elected on 23 October 2011 in the Constituent Assembly of Tunisia as the representative of the Second Constituency of France.

She is appointed as Assessor for Communication, Information, and Media Relations in the Constituent Assembly. As such, she is a member of the Bureau of the Assembly and of the Conference of Presidents.

On February 5, 2013, she resigns from Ettakatol and becomes independent, thus leaving the Troika political coalition. On March 23, she joins the Social Democratic Path known as al-Massar. In 2014, she leaves politics permanently and lives with her family in Lyon.

In 2014, she was awarded with the knight's insignia of the Tunisian Order of Merit.

References 

Living people
Politicians from Lyon
21st-century Tunisian women politicians
21st-century Tunisian politicians
Members of the Constituent Assembly of Tunisia
1971 births